The rivière du Pin is a tributary of the south bank of the rivière du Sud (Montmagny) which flows north-east to the south bank of the St. Lawrence, in the administrative region of Chaudière-Appalaches, in Quebec, in Canada.

The Rivière du Pin crosses the regional county municipalities (RCM) of:
 Les Etchemins Regional County Municipality: municipality of Saint-Magloire;
 Bellechasse Regional County Municipality: municipalities of Saint-Philémon, Armagh;
 Montmagny Regional County Municipality: municipality of Sainte-Euphémie-sur-Rivière-du-Sud.

Geography 
The Pin river has its source in a mountainous area in the municipality of Saint-Magloire in the Notre Dame Mountains.

From its source, the Pin river "flows in a valley encircled on  according to the following segments:
  towards the northeast, up to the limit between Saint-Magloire and Saint-Philémon;
  towards the north, collecting water from mountain streams, up to the falls "Les Portes de l'Enfer";
  northeasterly, to route 281;
  north-west, to the bridge on Chemin du Rang Saint-Isidore;
  north-west, up to the north-west limit of Saint-Philémon;
  towards the north-west, forming the limit between Armagh and Sainte-Euphémie-sur-Rivière-du-Sud;
  north, in Armagh, to the Fourche-du-Pin road bridge;
  north-west, up to its confluence.

The Pin river flows on the south shore of the rivière du Sud (Montmagny) at the limit of the municipalities of Armagh and Sainte-Euphémie-sur-Rivière-du-Sud.

Toponymy 
The toponym Rivière du Pin was formalized on December 5, 1968, at the Commission de toponymie du Québec.

See also 

 List of rivers of Quebec

References 

Rivers of Chaudière-Appalaches
Bellechasse Regional County Municipality
Les Etchemins Regional County Municipality
Montmagny Regional County Municipality